Gallery of Archduke Leopold Wilhelm in Brussels may refer to one of several gallery paintings by David Teniers the Younger:

 Archduke Leopold Wilhelm in his Painting Gallery in Brussels (Prado), 1651
 Gallery of Archduke Leopold Wilhelm in Brussels (Vienna), 1651
 Gallery of Archduke Leopold Wilhelm (Brussels), 1651
 Gallery of Archduke Leopold Wilhelm in Brussels (Petworth), 1651
 Gallery of Archduke Leopold Wilhelm in Brussels (Galdiano), 1653
 Gallery of Archduke Leopold Wilhelm in Brussels (Rothschild), 1653
 Gallery of Archduke Leopold Wilhelm in Brussels (Schleissheim), mid-1600s